A Cart on the Snowy Road at Honfleur is an oil-on-canvas snowscape painting by French impressionist Claude Monet. The painting depicts a man on a wooden cart travelling along a snow-laden road in Honfleur.

A Cart on the Snowy Road at Honfleur is one of nearly 140 snowscapes painted by Monet. It is believed to be his first completed snowscape, and is similar to other snowscapes by him such as The Road in Front of Saint-Simeon Farm in Winter, The Magpie, Snow at Argenteuil, and The Red Cape.

The painting is thought to be heavily influenced by the snowscapes of Japanese artist Utagawa Hiroshige (1797–1858), such as Ochanomizu and Clear weather after snow at Kaneyama (1797–1858). Aspects such as the single vanishing point and varied colors of snow can also trace their influences back to Japan.

Influences

See also
 List of paintings by Claude Monet

References

1865 paintings
Paintings by Claude Monet